Benoît Bouchard,  (born April 16, 1940) is a Canadian public official and former politician.

Biography
After a career as a professor and teacher, Bouchard was elected to the House of Commons of Canada as the Progressive Conservative Member of Parliament for Roberval in the 1984 election. He was immediately elevated to Prime Minister Brian Mulroney's Cabinet as Minister of State for Transport.

In 1985, he was promoted to Secretary of State for Canada. He subsequently served as Minister of Employment and Immigration (June 30, 1986 – March 30, 1988), Minister of Transport (March 31, 1988 – February 22, 1990), Minister of Industry, Science and Technology (February 23, 1990 – April 20, 1991), and Minister of National Health and Welfare (April 21, 1991 – June 1993).

In 1989, the federal budget mandated fiscal cuts to a broad range of departments and agencies, one of which was Bouchard's ministry at Transport Canada. As part of his department's efforts to cut its budget, Bouchard authorized Transport Canada to slash the subsidy to the national intercity passenger railway, Via Rail by 55%. Responding to the cuts, Bouchard said in a television interview several weeks later: "Ten years from now, no one will remember Benoît Bouchard cut Via Rail".

He retired from politics in June 1993 to accept an appointment as Canada's Ambassador to France.

In 1996, Bouchard returned to Canada and was appointed Chair of the Transportation Safety Board of Canada by Liberal Prime Minister Jean Chrétien. He oversaw the Canadian portion of the investigation of the Swissair Flight 111 air crash. He retired from the board in 2001.

In 2012, he was made a Member of the Order of Canada.
Since 2013, Benoit Bouchard is Canadian commissioner at the International Joint Commission Canada United States on Boundary Waters.

References

 
Foreign Affairs and International Trade Canada Complete List of Posts 

1940 births
Ambassadors of Canada to France
Canadian Ministers of Transport
Living people
Members of the House of Commons of Canada from Quebec
Members of the King's Privy Council for Canada
People from Roberval, Quebec
Progressive Conservative Party of Canada MPs
Canadian Ministers of Health and Welfare
Members of the Order of Canada
Members of the 24th Canadian Ministry
French Quebecers